Trevor Koehler  (1935-1975) was an American saxophonist. He recorded with Gil Evans, The Insect Trust, Cornell Dupree, Lou Reed, Octopus.  Allan Houser wrote a jazz piece called "Running Wild With Trevor Koehler" that he recorded with his sextet.  Father of Glade Koehler and Seth Koehler.

Trevor Koehler committed suicide in 1975.

Discography 
1968: Insect Trust, The Insect Trust - Drums, Wind, String Arrangements
1968: You Used to Think, Erica Pomerance - Sax (Alto)
1969: Octopus, Octopus - Saxophone, Sax (Baritone)
1970: Hoboken Saturday Night, The Insect Trust - Flute, Drums, Piccolo, Sax (Baritone), Sax (Soprano), Wind
1973: Svengali, Gil Evans - Flute, Sax (Baritone), Sax (Soprano), Soloist, Personnel
1973: Teasin, Cornell Dupree - Saxophone
1974: The Gil Evans Orchestra Plays the Music of Jimi Hendrix, Gil Evans - Flute, Arranger, Saxophone, Sax (Alto), Sax (Baritone), Sax (Tenor)
1974: Sally Can't Dance, Lou Reed

References

External links
The Insect Trust tribute and interviews
Gil Evans official website
[ Allmusic listing]

1935 births
1975 suicides
American jazz saxophonists
American male saxophonists
20th-century American saxophonists
20th-century American male musicians
American male jazz musicians